Darcy Byrne-Jones (born 20 September 1995) is an Australian rules footballer currently playing for the Port Adelaide Football Club in the Australian Football League (AFL).

He attended Scotch College, Melbourne with fellow draftees Jack Billings, Jake Kelly and Jack Sinclair.

He made his AFL debut in the third round of the 2016 AFL season, kicking his first goal with blood running down his face due to a previous collision with a teammate.

Byrne-Jones won a NAB Rising Star nomination in Round 10 of the 2016 AFL Season.

Byrne-Jones had a breakout season in 2019, finishing second in Port Adelaide's best and fairest award. He then had another breakout season in 2020, earning his first All-Australian selection and winning the John Cahill Medal.

References

External links

 

1995 births
Living people
Australian rules footballers from Victoria (Australia)
Oakleigh Chargers players
Port Adelaide Football Club (SANFL) players
Port Adelaide Football Club players (all competitions)
Port Adelaide Football Club players
All-Australians (AFL)
People educated at Scotch College, Melbourne